Babylonia kirana is a species of sea snail, a marine gastropod mollusk, in the family Babyloniidae.

References

kirana
Gastropods described in 1965